The Transpennine Route Upgrade (TRU) is a major investment being made in the railway between York and Manchester via Leeds and Huddersfield – the  northern route over the Pennines, most of which is also known as the Huddersfield line. , the line is heavily used but is slow and lacks capacity. It has Victorian infrastructure, covers difficult terrain including the  Standedge Tunnel, and has poor access roads. So, improving it is seen as challenging and very disruptive.

Since the rejection of Northern Powerhouse Rail's  aspiration for a new high speed line within Yorkshire, it has been questioned whether an upgraded Huddersfield line will provide sufficient capacity for the region's needs. However, the Integrated Rail Plan for the North and Midlands (IRP) that was announced in November 2021, did include full  electrification between Manchester and York, and subsequently W12 loading gauge to accommodate  refrigerated shipping containers throughout has been promised. The whole £911.5billion programme has been defined as phase one of Northern Powerhouse Rail, and is claimed to be the biggest infrastructure project in the UK. It consists of a succession of sub-projects designed to give incremental benefits to rail users of a period of time, with an anticipated overall completion date of between 2036 and 2041. In Manchester, the project interfaces with the Northern Hub.

There are three transpennine rail lines that connect Lancashire and Yorkshire. To the south of the Huddersfield line is the Hope Valley line which traverses even more difficult terrain including the  Totley Tunnel, and which in 2021 was allocated £137million investment to improve capacity and connectivity between Manchester and Sheffield. To the north the Calder Valley line joins Manchester and Leeds via Rochdale and Bradford (where trains have to reverse). This line has been strengthened to allow its use as a diversionary route while the Huddersfield line is upgraded.

Reopening the Woodhead line as a potential alternative Pennine crossing was ruled out early on. The Skipton–East Lancashire Rail Action Partnership is a campaign that is seeking the reopening of the  railway line that used to run between the Lancashire town of Colne and the Yorkshire town of Skipton. This could provide an additional transpennine route for both a commuter service and a relief transpennine freight route.

The need for upgrading 
There were up to 50million passenger journeys per year on this line pre COVID-19 on fast (including TransPennine Express), semi-fast and stopping trains, and also freight trains. The existing passenger service is widely accepted as being very unsatisfactory in terms of journey time, frequency, punctuality and level of passenger comfort. At its worst, 15% of passengers had to stand in peak times .  The  railway line between Leeds and Manchester links two key population centres. Leeds is the largest city in Yorkshire, and forms the main area of the City of Leeds metropolitan borough. It is the central city of the Leeds City Region which has a population of over 3million, making it the second most populated metropolitan city region in the United Kingdom, behind Greater London. Manchester is the most-populous city and metropolitan borough in North West England. It lies within the  third most-populous county, at around 2.8million people. Manchester is often referred to as the second city of the United Kingdom, although this is disputable. York was voted European Tourism City of the Year in June 2007. Linking these population centres together by a low-polluting, low-carbon mode of transport such as electric trains is now seen as essential.

The equivalent transpennine road link is the M62 motorway, which provides the most practical route for heavy goods vehicles and other commercial traffic between Manchester and Leeds. However, the section between junctions 18 and 29 through Greater Manchester and West Yorkshire has been identified as one of the most congested roads in Britain. Three of the five largest metro areas in England that contain a significant number of warehouses requiring deliveries to and from the ports at Merseyside and the Humber, are linked by the M62. Annual average daily traffic flows of 100,000 were recorded east of the Pennines at junction 22 in 2006 and 78,000 west of the Pennines. The UK government has long recognised the advantages of modal shift from road to rail.

Most main railway lines in England radiate out from London with very few, such as the transpennine routes, going at right angles to these. It is widely accepted that there is a North–South divide in England, with government spending per person on drivers of growth such as transport infrastructure, being far higher in the South-East than the North. London has a directly elected mayor with control over public transport whilst most Northern cities have transport policies decided by Westminster. In 2021, the Conservative government launched a Levelling up policy to address the North–South divide as part of a broader objective. All of the above factors mean the Transpennine Route Upgrade is high on the political agenda for all parties.

In March 2021, Parliament's Transport Select Committee published a report in the series of Trains Fit for the Future enquiry. It recommended a rolling programme of electrification. There was also a call for the Department for Transport (DfT) to publish without delay a list of “no regret” electrification schemes, and then for the industry to act on them. The report also reached the mainstream media with headlines of “MPs call for a rolling programme of electrification”.

A succession of proposals

Before 2020
The initial proposal in the 21st century was to electrify the line from Manchester Victoria to Leeds via Huddersfield, with some infill schemes around Manchester. This was announced in the 2011 Autumn Statement by the Chancellor of the Exchequer. The cost was cited as £290million and the project was planned to start in 2014. In the 2012 High Level Output Specification (HLOS), it was announced there would be additional electrification from Leeds to Selby.

Northern Powerhouse Rail (sometimes called High Speed 3) was established in 2014 to substantially enhance the economy of the North of England. It would have provided new and significantly upgraded railway lines to transform rail services between the region's towns and cities. The original scheme would have seen a new high-speed rail line from Liverpool to Warrington then joining the HS2 tunnel which it would share into Manchester Piccadilly. From there, the line would have continued via a new through station at Bradford, to Leeds. However, in November 2021 the Integrated Rail Plan for the North and Midlands was published which removed all of the new line in Yorkshire, from the plan.

In March 2015, the Chancellor George Osborne announced there would be an additional rolling programme of improvement and electrification to Hull. In July 2012, the UK government announced £4.2billion of  electrification schemes. The Transpennine Route Upgrade from Manchester to York and Selby via Leeds was announced at this time. In November 2014, the deputy prime minister Nick Clegg reported on the government's desire to see the whole route upgraded and electrified.

Manchester Victoria has already had electrification equipment installed as part of the northwest programmes.  On other parts of the route, including between Leeds and York, bridge raising and other civil engineering works were started in March 2015. Other bridges in Tameside between Manchester Victoria and Stalybridge were also worked on. Further civil engineering contracts were awarded in 2017. Various local authorities have also provided updates. On a visit to Leeds on 2 March 2018, Transport Secretary Chris Grayling said the upgrade would continue.

2020 and beyond
, ten years after the Autumn Statement announcement, the line was still being upgraded in stages. It has been stated that the delays are due to political dithering.
In 2021, considerable work was done in the Miles Platting area, to pave the way for wires all the way to Stalybridge,  with a compound constructed. Network Rail said that there would be significant disruption over at least a five year period. However, in an order under the Transport and Works Act 1992 (TWAO) published in March 2021, it was said that work on some of the scheme would extend beyond 2029 i.e. into a later Network Rail Control Periods, CP8. A total blockade took place on the route between Manchester Victoria and Stalybridge and Rochdale between 31 July and 15 August 2021. This work was completed on time. On 5 October 2021 Proofs of Evidence were submitted by Network Rail to the Department for Transport.

On 26 May 2021, it was confirmed that a further £317million was being spent on the upgrade, and confirmed the electrification of the line between York and Church Fenton, although Network Rail had already started to install masts for overhead line electrification (OLE) on this route in February 2021. On 4 June 2021, it was confirmed that the £317million was in addition to the £589million previously announced and further confirmed that electrification would go from Huddersfield to Leeds. It was also stated that work would begin immediately. However, this is disputed according to one source.

, Network Rail are working on the sections between York and Church Fenton, Huddersfield and Westtown (Dewsbury) and Manchester and Stalybridge. It is planned to upgrade the signalling, to increase tracks from two to four in places, and to implement other track changes and renewals that improve line speed and hence give shorter journey times. Parts of the cost of upgrading have been quoted at £2.9billion and £3.1billion in total. In 2021, the government allocated £589million of funding for the section between Leeds and Huddersfield. There are a total of 23 stations including the Grade I listed Huddersfield station, and major viaducts at Dewsbury, Batley, Milnsbridge and Huddersfield. Nine structures along the route require listed building approval.

The planned upgrade of the  section between Huddersfield and Westtown (Dewsbury) is of particular significance. It is the best place on the route to provide a facility for fast trains to overtake slower ones, by increasing the number of tracks from two to four. Also, by building a bridge that will provide grade separation at Thornhill L.N.W. Junction, it will eliminate conflicts between trains travelling along the Calder valley between Brighouse and Wakefield and those travelling between Huddersfield and Leeds. On 27 June 2022, the Secretary of State for Transport's decision to grant the Order under the Transport and Works Act (the TWAO) for this section was published. This includes quadrupling the track across most of the route, the provision of grade separation at Ravensthorpe and works to the stations, as well as electrification throughout.  

On 18 November 2021 the Integrated Rail Plan for the North and Midlands (IRP) was published. This included a commitment to the Transpennine north railway upgrade to include full electrification. The completion date for all works was cited as 2032. However, the IRP did not include most of the eastern leg of HS2, nor the high speed rail line from Manchester all the way to Leeds. Instead, it says a high speed line would be built east from Manchester to Marsden, which is just over the border into West Yorkshire, at the eastern end of the Standedge Tunnels. Cllr Louise Gittins, Interim Chair of Transport for the North, said that: “Today’s announcement is woefully inadequate. After decades of underfunding, the rail network in the North is not fit for purpose. It is largely twin-track Victorian infrastructure trying to cope with the demands of a 21st Century economy." The leaders of the upgrade held a round table conference November 2022 discussing progress and strategy for keeping disruption to a minimum.

In September 2022 Boris Johnson ceased to be Prime Minister of the United Kingdom and was replaced by Liz Truss. In her bid to get that job, she had promised that the Transpennine route upgrade would be delivered in full, with electrification all the way between Liverpool and Hull including a stop in Bradford. However, she was succeeded by Rishi Sunak in October 2022, and his government returned to the position of the Johnson administration.

Technical details

Anticipated benefits and timescales
Although the overall project completion date may be as late as 2041, some benefits should be felt in late 2024 or early 2025 when electric trains are due to run over the improved track layout between Manchester Victoria and Stalybridge (Projects W1/W2a), and bi-mode trains will be able to use electric traction between Church Fenton and York (Project E1). Benefits will also be available for users between Lancashire and Yorkshire from improvements to the Calder Valley line via Rochdale and the Hope Valley line to Sheffield, when these are used as diversionary routes because of work on the Huddersfield line.

Funding approval for Projects E2/3/4 and W3 is to be sought in 2023. Projects E2/3/4 should lead to reduced journey times between Leeds and Church Fenton, with improvements at Leeds station, electrification and capacity improvements including reduced conflicts from Neville Hill depot. Project W3 concerns the section between Huddersfield and Ravensthorpe. This will involve improvements to Huddersfield station including an increase from three to four through platforms, four-tracking between the two stations, with grade separation at Ravensthorpe, and the movement of Ravensthorpe station to serve trains on the Calder Valley line in addition to the Huddersfield line.

Projects W2b/c concern the Stalybridge to Marsden and Marsden to Huddersfield sections. These include track realignment between Stalybridge and Diggle, and the provision of a third track to act as a "Crawler Lane for freight trains climbing up from Huddersfield to Marsden.

Transport Works Act Order
On 31 March 2021, a TWAO was published with plans showing the scope of the works. The whole scheme document was split up into portions, with W referring to portions to the west, and E to portions to the east of Leeds.

The TWAO covered the following sections:

The scheme was further updated with the section between Stalybridge and Huddersfield being split further at Marsden.  

 W1 – Manchester Victoria to Stalybridge: line speed increases and electrification
 W2a – Stalybridge station: general improvements and remodelling of the junction at the west of the station
 W2c – Marsden to Huddersfield
 W3 – Huddersfield to Ravensthorpe: line speed improvements and electrification
 W4 – Ravensthorpe to Leeds: line speed improvements and electrification
 W5 – Morley station: greater line speed and electrification
 E1 – North of Church Fenton to York: line speed improvements and electrification
 E2 – Leeds station improvements
 E3 – Crossgate to Micklefield 
 E4 – Micklefield to Church Fenton

At the end of 2022, work for sections W1 and E1 was under way and a TWAO application had been submitted for W3.

Under the order sections W1, W2a, W3, W4, W5 and E1 were permitted to proceed to the design stage. Sections W2b and E2-E4 were permitted to develop further to GRIP 3 status. As part of the upgrade, eleven stations along the route will require a review of options for persons of reduced mobility such as step-free access and other enhancements.

Power supply
The electrical power for the scheme on the west side of the scheme, is being provided from the grid feeder in the Stalybridge area at Heyrod. It was visited by Jonathan Reynolds, the local MP for the constituency on 27 May 2016. The latest plans in the TWAO call for a SFC (Static Frequency Converter) in the Ravensthorpe vicinity rather than a full grid feeder station.

Bridges
There are a number of bridges being upgraded and strengthened or otherwise modified as part of the project. In the Manchester area they include the bridge at Dantzic Street in the centre of Manchester. In the Miles Platting area, Queens Road bridge is being modified, as is the Bromley Street subway and also at Oldham Road. In Ashton-under-Lyne in the Southampton Street and Granville Street area, overbridges were raised in April and May 2022. Between Huddersfield and Ravensthorpe, twelve bridges will be demolished and replaced, a small number will be adapted, and one will be removed altogether.

Crossings
A consultation has been launched with residents on the plan to close Lady Anne level crossing and Batley signal box as part of the upgrade. Consultations have also been launched on other crossings being considered for closure. These consultations include discussion of environmental mitigation necessity. A TWAO was submitted July 2022 to close three level crossings (Rose Lane, Adamsons and Poulters) and replace with one new road and bridge with pavement and mitigated for reduced mobility access. It has been called the Church Fenton Level Crossing Reduction, and will give access to the farms and homes in the area. Other crossings are being modified and closed in the scope of these works, some of which affect public rights of way.

Gantry design
As Huddersfield station is a Grade I listed building, a special design was submitted that precludes the use of headspan overhead line gantries and uses a bespoke design. The planning application to Kirklees council shows total closure of the station for  two 32 day periods from April to May 2024 and also April to May 2025.

Timeline of announcements and programme pauses and starts
 November 2011: Autumn statement announcing electrification of the line
 July 2012: Addition of Leeds to Selby announced as part of HLOS
 November 2014: Deputy prime minister states government's desire for the whole route to be electrified 
 March 2015: Civil engineering including overbridge raising works start at various places
 March 2015: Chancellor announces extra electrification from Selby to Hull
 June 2015: work on the whole scheme paused by Secretary of State for Transport
 September 2015: work on the scheme resumed 
 August 2016: GRIP 1 complete
 December 2016: GRIP 2 complete
 March 2017: various civil engineering contracts awarded
 December 2017: GRIP 3 complete
 March 2018: Transport Secretary confirms work on the upgrade would continue 
 January 2021: Piling commences in two locations along the route
 March 2021: Transport Works Act Order published
 April 2021: Network Rail confirm piling in Miles Platting area to completed by end of 2021
 4 June 2021: Confirmation of £317million extra funding and work to begin immediately.
 31 July  15 August 2021: Blockade and blitz strategy Manchester Victoria to Stalybridge and Rochdale. Completed on time and budget.
 18 November 2021: The Integrated Rail Plan is published committing to the full upgrade and electrification.
 27 June 2022: Yes decision published by the Department of Transport for the Ravensthorpe TWAO (W3).
 19 July 2022: House of Commons announcement by the Secretary of State for Transport that another £959million of funding had been made available for the project.
 20 July 2022: National Audit Office publish a report into the upgrade saying the case had been firmly made for the upgrade but risks remain, money had been wasted, and was critical of the DfT taking so long to agree the scope of the works.
 November 2022: Announcement that wires had started going up in the Stalybridge area.
 January 2023: Announcement of a new Managing Director for the route upgrade project and  a major 26 day blockade and diversions for Stalybridge area and other closures including Morley station, in the February to April 2023 timeframe.
 February 2023: Morley station blockade completed on schedule. The new station is due to open in Summer 2023.

See also
 21st-century modernisation of the Great Western Main Line
 Felixstowe–Nuneaton railway upgrade
 History of rail transport in Great Britain 1995 to date
 List of proposed railway electrification routes in Great Britain
 Midland Main Line railway upgrade
 North West England electrification schemes
 Overhead line
 Railway electrification in Scotland
 West Coast Main Line route modernisation

References

Further reading
  also available as a free PDF download at www.ocs4rail.com

External links
 Transpennine Route Upgrade website
 Campaign to Electrify Britain's Railways Website
 Great North Rail Project – Network Rail

Electrification
Rail transport in Greater Manchester
Railway lines
Rail infrastructure in the United Kingdom
Rail transport in Yorkshire
Railway upgrades in the United Kingdom